As Told by Ginger (also known as As Told by Ginger Foutley) is an American animated comedy-drama television series aimed at preteens, produced by Klasky Csupo (which also produced Rugrats), and aired on Nickelodeon. The series focuses on a junior high school (later high school) girl named Ginger Foutley who, with her friends, tries to become more than a social geek. The series first aired on Nickelodeon on October 25, 2000.

As Told by Ginger ended production in 2004, although some episodes remain unaired on U.S. television. It was nominated for three Primetime Emmy Awards for Outstanding Animated Program (for Programming Less Than One Hour). The series was approved and noted for the fact that it had ongoing story arcs and characters who developed, aged and changed their clothes throughout the show, a rare quality in an animated series at the time it came out.

Premise

Characters

The series focuses mainly on the life of junior high school student Ginger Foutley (voiced by Melissa Disney). Ginger and her friends Darren Patterson (voiced by Kenny Blank), Deirdre Hortense "Dodie" Bishop (voiced by Aspen Miller), and Macie Lightfoot (voiced by Jackie Harris), try to rise from the position of school geeks as they solve many conflicts that come their way.

Luckily for Ginger, the most popular girl in school, Courtney Gripling (voiced by Liz Georges), has taken a liking to her and often includes her in her social plans. She is intrigued by her "gingerisms", as Courtney calls them. However, Miranda Killgallen (voiced by Cree Summer), Courtney's right-hand woman, makes sure that she is not bumped down from her position thanks to Ginger. At home, Ginger writes her lively adventures in her diary. Her younger brother, Carl (voiced by Jeannie Elias), is often scheming with Robert Joseph "Hoodsey" Bishop (voiced by Tress MacNeille) in his own side plots, and her mother, Lois (voiced by Laraine Newman), is always there for advice – to which Ginger is always able to listen.

Setting
The series takes place in the fictional suburban town of Sheltered Shrubs, located in Connecticut. Sheltered Shrubs is based on the real town of Larchmont, New York, where series creator Emily Kapnek moved to when she was in junior high. She said the town became "sort of the basis for this show". Other towns noted in the series are Protected Pines, a gated community in which Courtney lives, Brittle Branches, where Ginger's father resides, and Heathered Hills, the town of Ginger's summer camp crush, Sasha.

Continuity and themes
As Told by Ginger has been recognized by fans and Nickelodeon alike for its character development, most of which was unusual for a cartoon in its time.

In the first season, Ginger's age group is considered as being in seventh grade. By the second season, they move up to eighth grade rather than remaining the same age. In this season, Darren has his unwieldy orthodontic headgear that he has worn for the entire first season removed, which results in rising popularity. They graduate junior high in the middle of the third season and move on to becoming freshmen in high school. Carl's age group works in a same way, as they become junior high students by the third season. Many episodes make references to past episodes, giving the episodes a definite order.

One of the most noticeable developments is that the characters change clothes every episode and often newer every day within the same episode, a highly unusual characteristic of cartoons in animation. Most animated cartoons have their characters remain in the same outfits throughout the series to save time and money. This was most conspicuous amongst the girls in Ginger's age group (Dodie, Courtney, Macie, Miranda and Ginger herself) and some of the adults such as Ginger's mother. After Darren got his orthodontic headgear removed, he changed clothes as well. Carl's age group changes clothes only infrequently and with few changes. Hoodsey's coat rack has similar purple hoodies, satirizing cartoons whose characters always remain in the same outfits. Unlike most live-action shows whose characters only wear an outfit once, As Told by Ginger characters wear their outfits in rotation, and new outfits are added every few episodes.

The series also deals with several deeper themes. In "Wicked Game", Ginger's two best friends betray her after feeling jealousy toward her new boyfriend, Darren. In "And She Was Gone", the staff and students at school think Ginger is suicidally depressed after she writes a disturbing poem that worries them. In the episode "No Hope for Courtney", Carl's pranks cause his teacher to retire. After she agrees to come back, Mrs. Gordon passes on. In actuality, Mrs. Gordon's voice actress, Kathleen Freeman, died before the episode's completion, and the script was rewritten in dedication to her. "A Lesson in Tightropes" has Ginger going through an emotional breakup with Darren while she must undergo surgery for appendicitis. Furthermore, the episode "Stuff'll Kill Ya" shows Ginger dealing with a coffee and caffeine drug addiction. The old saying of "follow your dreams" became a whole new meaning. In "Butterflies Are Free" Part 1, when Dodie became so fascinated about the pep squad, she wanted to try out. However, the coach in charge of the team told her that a freshman has never succeeded in the attempt of the usual process. But despite that piece of info, she still became inspired. In "Kiss Today Goodbye", Dodie continue to further her attempt by cooking healthy meals for the coach, cleaning cheerleading outfits, presenting the team. In "Dodie's Big Break", she became a gopher, which is Lucky High School's mascot, and performed in her first game. Unfortunately she got injured, which led to her becoming a part of the team. Unfortunately, it got taken away from her after she confessed to faking the injury that she recovered from. After being confronted by Ginger, Coach Candace allowed Dodie back into the squad and she allowed her to try out. But she injured her leg again and Dodie is allowed to try again in her sophomore year.

 In the TV film The Wedding Frame, when the Foutleys are driving to their soon-to-be home, they pass a cemetery park. One tombstone reads "ATBG" while another reads "RIP". ATBG is short for As Told by Ginger and RIP is short for "Rest in Peace". This is a nod to the fact that the film is the series finale.
 A girl named Leandra, who had a bone marrow illness and was a Make-A-Wish patient, was a fan of the series and watched it during her treatments. Her wish was to be a character on the show, so she appeared and voiced a character named after herself in a scene of the episode "Butterflies are Free", in which Ginger, Macie and Dodie greet her by name.

Unlike most other Nicktoons, the series was aired on the TEENick block.

Episodes

Television films
There were four television films that aired during the series' run.
 Summer of Camp Caprice (also titled Season of Caprice) had Ginger, Dodie, Macie and Courtney heading to summer camp, with Darren and Miranda going to military camp (where, as it happens, Miranda's father works) and Carl and Hoodsey on the trail of dog nappers.
 Foutleys on Ice (aired in the US as Far from Home), following up on the Emmy-nominated episode "And She Was Gone", dealt with Ginger winning a scholarship to an arts school, and Carl and Hoodsey making friends with a new character, the telekinetic Noelle Sussman (voiced by series creator Emily Kapnek). This episode was released on DVD.
 Butterflies are Free follows Ginger and her friends graduating from junior high.
 The Wedding Frame closed out the third season and the series as a whole, and features Lois marrying one of the doctors at her hospital.

Nickelodeon had originally asked for the ending of The Wedding Frame to be changed to something less conclusive in case they wished to order more episodes, however, perhaps due to that situation being very unlikely, the original ending was eventually retained. It was released directly to DVD in the United States in November 2004, but it was not broadcast in the U.S.; also, one of the episodes ("Battle of the Bands") leading up to the film has never aired in the U.S. either, resulting in some continuity issues.

In international airings, the films were divided into two (for Butterflies are Free) and three parts (for the other three films) in reruns.

Production
The pilot for the show was completed in September 1999. The show premiered in October 2000 on Nickelodeon. The show was greatly popular at first, making its way into the teenager-aimed block TEENick. After the second season, the show's popularity began to decline, partially due to constant scheduling changes. Nickelodeon then pulled the show off the air after airing less than half the episodes of the third and final season. The show was a part of the Nicktoons channel since its inception in 2002, and began airing the remaining third-season episodes in November 2004, when "Ten Chairs" premiered. The "high school" episodes were slated to premiere during November 2006, but only one, "Stuff'll Kill Ya", premiered. The aforementioned Season 3 episodes remain unaired, though they instead aired on teen-oriented block The N.

Show airings

 The episodes "I Spy a Witch", "Déjà Who?", "An 'Even Steven' Holiday Special" and "Piece of My Heart" were all made for the first season lineup, but aired during the second season in the United States.
 "Never Can Say Goodbye", "Gym Class Confidential", "Fast Reputation" and "The Nurses' Strike" all premiered in the same week during the TEENick block. They aired February 11–14, 2002 (which were the days between Monday and Thursday).
 The episodes "Detention", "Kiss Today Good-bye", "A Lesson in Tightropes", "Dodie's Big Break" and "Battle of the Bands" are all high school episodes that were unaired in the United States. They were at one time scheduled to air during the second week of November 2006, but were immediately removed from the schedule after the first high school episode, "Stuff'll Kill Ya", was aired. In several other countries, especially in the United Kingdom, they are part of regular reruns.

DVD and streaming releases
 The TV films Far from Home and The Wedding Frame are available on DVD in the United States and Canada (Region 1). Far from Home comes with the bonus episodes "Ginger the Juvey" and the pilot episode "The Party". The Wedding Frame includes "Stealing First" and "Dare I, Darren".
 The complete series used to be available on iTunes; the 60 episodes were divided into six volumes. As of January 2015, the episodes are no longer available for download.
 As of January 2021, the series is available to stream on Paramount+ (formerly known as CBS All Access).
 The episodes 1 through 45 are available on Russian DVD sets with each DVD containing 5 episodes. The As Speaks Ginger DVDs, as they are known in Russia (Cyrillic: Как говорит Джинджер), are produced and distributed by Russobit-M and are only available with a Russian soundtrack.

Theme song
The opening theme, titled "I'm in Between", was written for the show by American rapper Ray Raymond. The song was first recorded with vocals by Melissa Disney, in character as Ginger. But this version was replaced before initial North American broadcasts with another version performed by Cree Summer. This would be used for half of the first season before a third version, featuring vocals by R&B artist Macy Gray, which was used for the rest of the series' run.

In the UK broadcasts, the Melissa Disney and Cree Summer versions were used for the first two seasons, while the Macy Gray version was used for season three. Internationally, the Macy Gray version is the most recognizable version.

Closing credits
The closing credits are typically-designed backgrounds with the show's signature font. These backgrounds include the ice cream cones from Ginger's bedroom walls, ladybugs from Dodie's bedroom walls, pencils, lizards and more. In several episodes, the ending theme is a rock-based instrumental, although there have been exceptions. "Piece of My Heart" ends with a different and softer instrumental melody. The episode "Never Can Say Goodbye" ended with a song called "Wrong", sung by voice actor Kenny Blank as Darren Patterson, and "And She Was Gone" ended with a musical version of Ginger's poem during the credits. The episode "Come Back, Little Seal Girl" featured the songs "Courtney's World" and "The Little Seal Girl" blended together. In "About Face", a song called "Diamonds Are Expensive", presumably sung by the engaged Lois and Dr. Dave, is played over the credits. "Next Question" ended with "The Teen Seal Girl" song. Finally, the episode "No Hope for Courtney" had no music during the credits, being dedicated to the memory of Kathleen Freeman.

Awards
 Three Emmy nominations for "Hello Stranger" (in 2001), "Lunatic Lake" (in 2002), and "And She Was Gone" (in 2003). All three were nominated in the Outstanding Animated Program (Less than One Hour) category.
 "Best Cartoon" at Nickelodeon Netherlands Kids Choice Awards in 2005.
 Two episodes of As Told by Ginger were ranked in Nickelodeon's "100 Greatest Moments in Nicktoons History", a special presented by Nickelodeon in November 2007. The episodes "Gym Class Confidential" and "Stealing First" were ranked at 97 and 95.

Explanatory notes

References

Further reading

External links
 
 
 "FOR YOUNG VIEWERS; Leaving Larchmont, Again" in The New York Times

 
2000 American television series debuts
2006 American television series endings
2000s American animated television series
2000s American high school television series
2000s Nickelodeon original programming
American children's animated comedy television series
American children's animated drama television series
Animated television series about families
English-language television shows
Middle school television series
Nicktoons
Teen animated television series
Television shows set in Connecticut
Television series created by Emily Kapnek
Television series by Klasky Csupo